Senator Hundley may refer to:

Oscar Richard Hundley (1855–1921), Alabama State Senate
Walter Hundley (born 1953), South Carolina State Senate